Wojciech Rajtar (born 18 September 1976 in Poland) is a Polish retired footballer.

References

Polish footballers
Association football midfielders
1976 births
Living people
Hutnik Nowa Huta players